The 2007 Boys' Youth European Volleyball Championship was played in Austria from 11 to 16 April 2007. The top two teams were qualified for the 2007 Youth World Championship.

Participating teams
 Hosts
 
 Qualified through 2007 Boys' Youth European Volleyball Championship Qualification

Pools composition

Squads

Preliminary round

Pool A

|}

Pool B

|}

Pool C

|}

Pool D

|}

Final round

9th–12th place

9th–12th semifinals

11th place match

9th place match

Quarterfinals

5th–8th place

5th–8th semifinals

7th place match

5th place match

Final

Semifinals

3rd place match

Final

Final standing

Individual awards

Most Valuable Player
 Guillaume Quesque
Best Spiker
 Ludovico Dolfo
Best Blocker
 Dmitry Shcherbinin
Best Server
 Markus Steuerwald
Best Setter
 Benjamin Toniutti
Best Scorer
 Bram Van Den Dries
Best Libero
 Dirk Sparidans

External links
Official website 

European Boys' Youth Championship
Volleyball
Boys' Youth European Volleyball Championship
International volleyball competitions hosted by Austria